Serine/threonine-protein phosphatase PP1-alpha catalytic subunit is an enzyme that in humans is encoded by the PPP1CA gene.

Function 

The protein encoded by this gene is one of the three catalytic subunits of protein phosphatase 1 (PP1). PP1 is a serine/threonine specific protein phosphatase known to be involved in the regulation of a variety of cellular processes, such as cell division, glycogen metabolism, muscle contractility, protein synthesis, and HIV-1 viral transcription. Increased PP1 activity has been observed in the end stage of heart failure. Studies in both human and mice suggest that PP1 is an important regulator of cardiac function. Mouse studies also suggest that PP1 functions as a suppressor of learning and memory. Three alternatively spliced transcript variants encoding different isoforms have been found for this gene.

Interactive pathway map

Interactions 
PPP1CA has been shown to interact with:

 AKAP11, 
 BCL2-like 1, 
 BCL2L2, 
 BRCA1, 
 CDC5L, 
 Host cell factor C1, 
 KvLQT1, 
 LMTK2, 
 PHACTR3, 
 PPP1R15A, 
 PPP1R8, 
 PPP1R9B,
 Protein kinase R,  and
 SMARCB1.

References

Further reading